Governor Hughes may refer to:

L. C. Hughes (1842–1915), 11th Governor of Arizona Territory from 1893 to 1896
Charles Evans Hughes (1862–1948), 36th governor of New York from 1907 to 1910
Harry Hughes (born 1926), 57th governor of Maryland from 1979 to 1987
Harold Hughes (1922–1996), 36th governor of Iowa from 1963 to 1969
Richard J. Hughes (1909–1992), 45th governor of New Jersey from 1962 to 1970